Bagou station is a station on Line 10 and Xijiao line (light rail) of the Beijing Subway. It opened July 19, 2008. It was the northwestern terminus of Line 10 until phase two of expansion completed the Line 10 loop.

Station Layout 
The line 10 station has underground dual-island platforms. The Xijiao line station has a single-sided platform.

Exits 
There are 5 exits, lettered A, B, C1, C2, and C3. Exits A and B are accessible.

Gallery

External links

Beijing Subway stations in Haidian District
Railway stations in China opened in 2008